Pantasote is an imitation leather material made by the Pantasote Company, beginning in 1891. It was a durable, relatively inexpensive material used as upholstery and for tents and awnings.

References
 GSA: General information"

Upholstery